Slavey (also Slave, Slavé) is a group of Athabaskan languages and a dialect continuum spoken amongst the Dene peoples of Canada in the Northwest Territories – or central Denendeh – where it also has official status. The languages are primarily written using a modified Latin script, with some using Canadian Aboriginal syllabics. In their own languages, these languages are referred to as: Sahtúgot’įné Yatı̨́ (spoken by the Sahtu Dene), K’ashógot’įne Goxedǝ́ (the Hare Dene dialect) and Shíhgot’įne Yatı̨́ (the Mountain dialect) in the North, and Dené Dháh (primarily by the Dene Tha' in Alberta), Dene Yatıé or Dene Zhatıé in the South.

North Slavey and South Slavey 
North Slavey is spoken by the Sahtu (North Slavey) people in the Mackenzie District along the middle Mackenzie River from Tulita (Fort Norman) north, around Great Bear Lake, and in the Mackenzie Mountains of the Canadian territory of Northwest Territories. The dialect has around 800 speakers.

Northern Slavey is an amalgamation of three separate dialects: 
 K’ashógot’įne (ᑲᑊᗱᑯᑎᑊᓀ) Goxedǝ́: Hare, spoken by the Gahwié got’iné - "Rabbitskin People" or K’áshogot’ıne - "Great Hare People", referring to their dependence on the varying hare for food and clothing, also called Peaux de Lievre or Locheaux
 Sahtúgot’įné (ᓴᑋᕲᒼᑯᑎᑊᓀ) Yatı̨́: Bear Lake, spoken by the Sahtu Dene or Sahtú got’iné - "Bear Lake People", also known as Gens du Lac d'Ours
 Shíhgot’įne (ᗰᑋᑯᑎᑊᓀ) Yatı̨́: Mountain, spoken by the Shıhgot’ıné, Shuhtaot'iné or Shotah Dene - "Mountain People" or Mountain Indians, also called Nahagot’iné, Nahaa or Nahane Dene - "People of the west", so called because they lived in the mountains west of the other Slavey groups, between the Mackenzie Mountains and the Mackenzie River, from the Redstone River to the Mountain River

South Slavey (ᑌᓀ ᒐ Dené Dháh, Dene Yatıé or Dene Zhatıé) is spoken by the Slavey people, who were also known as Dehghaot'ine, Deh Cho, Etchareottine - "People Dwelling in the Shelter", in the region of Great Slave Lake, upper Mackenzie River (Deh Cho - "Big River") and its drainage, in the District of Mackenzie, northeast Alberta, northwest British Columbia.

Some communities are bilingual, with the children learning Slavey at home and English when they enter school. Still other communities are monolingual in Slavey  The dialect has around 1000 speakers.

Alternative names: Slavi, Slave, Dené, Mackenzian

The division of Slavey dialects is based largely on the way each one pronounces the old Proto-Athapaskan sounds *dz *ts *ts’ *s and *z.

Phonology

Consonants

The consonant inventories in the dialects of Slavey differ considerably. The table above lists the 30 consonants common to most or all varieties. Hare lacks aspirated affricates (on red background), which have lenited into fricatives, whereas Mountain lacks  (on blue). In addition, for some speakers of Hare, an alveolar flap  has developed into a separate phoneme. Prenasalized stops  may appear in Slavey proper.

The most pronounced difference is however the realization of a series of consonants that varies greatly in their place of articulation:

In Slavey proper, these are dental affricates and fricatives; comparative Athabaskan work reveals this to be the oldest sound value. Mountain has labials, with the voiceless stop coinciding with pre-existing . Bearlake has labialized velars, but has lenited the voiced fricative to coincide with pre-existing .

Phonological processes

The following phonological and phonetic statements apply to all four dialects of Slavey.

 Unaspirated obstruents are either voiceless or weakly voiced, e.g.
  →  or 
 Aspirated obstruents are strongly aspirated.
 Ejectives are strongly ejective.
 When occurring between vowels, ejectives are often voiced, e.g.
  →  or 
  is usually strongly velarized, i.e. .
 Velar obstruents are palatalized before front vowels, e.g.
  → 
  → 
  → 
 Velar fricatives may be labialized before round vowels.
 The voiceless fricative is usually labialized, e.g.
  → 
 The voiced fricative is optionally labialized and may additionally be defricated e.g.
 Velar stops are also labialized before round vowels. These labialized velars are not as heavily rounded as labial velars (which occur in Bearlake and Hare), e.g.
  → 
  → 
 Lateral affricates are generally alveolar, but sometimes velar, i.e.
  →  or 
  →  or 
  →  or 
  may be velar or glottal, i.e.
  →  or

Vowels

 a 
 e  or  when followed by a back vowel
 ə  or 
 o 
 u 
 nasal vowels are marked with an ogonek accent, e.g.  
Vowel length is distributed as /VV/ in the dialects of Bearlake, Slavey and Mountain.
 South Slavey does not have the  vowel.

Tone 

Slavey has two tones:

 high
 low

In Slavey orthography, high tone is marked with an acute accent, and low tone is unmarked.

Tones are both lexical and grammatical.

Lexical:  'along' vs.  'rabbit'

Syllable structure
Slavey morphemes have underlying syllable structures in the stems: CV, CVC, CVnC, V, and VC. The prefixes of the stem occur as Cv, CVC, VC, CV, and C.

Writing system
Slavey alphabet (1973)

Tone is indicated with an acute accent and the ogonek indicates nasalization.

North Slavey alphabet

South Slavey alphabet

Morphology
Slavey, like many Athabascan languages, has a very specific morpheme order in the verb in which the stem must come last. The morpheme order is shown in the following chart.

A Slavey verb must minimally have positions 13 and 14 to be proper. Here are some examples:

Person, number and gender

Gender
Slavey marks gender by means of prefixation on the verb theme. There are three different genders, one of which is unmarked; the other two are marked by prefixes [go-] and [de-]. However, only certain verb themes allow gender prefixes.

[go-] is used for nouns which mark location in either time or space. Some examples of these areal nouns are house (ko̜̒e̒), land (de̒h), river (deh), and winder (xay). The gender pronoun can be a direct object, an oblique object or a possessor.

[de-] marks wood, leaves and branches. This gender is optional: some speakers use it and others do not.

Number
Slavey marks number in the subject prefixes in position 12. The dual is marked by the prefix łe̒h- (Sl)/łe- (Bl)/le- (Hr).

ni̒łe̒gehtthe
'They two got stuck in a narrow passage.'

The plural is marked with the prefix go-.

Dahgogehthe
'They dance.'

ʔeha̒goni̒dhe
'We go for meat.'

Person
Slavey has first, second, third, and fourth person. When in position 12, acting as a subject, first-person singular is /h-/, second-person singular is /ne-/, first-person dual/plural is /i̒d-/, and second person plural is marked by /ah-/. Third person is not marked in this position. When occurring as a direct or indirect object, the pronoun prefixes change and fourth person becomes relevant.

 First-person singular takes se-.
 Second-person singular takes ne-
 Third person is marked by be-/me-
 Fourth person is marked by ye-

Classification
Like most Athabaskan languages, Slavey has a multitude of classifications. There  are five basic categories that describe the nature of an object. Some of these categories are broken up further.

Tense and aspect

Tense

Slavey has only one structural tense: future. Other tenses can be indicated periphrastically.

An immediate future can be formed by the de- inceptive (position 9) plus y-.

Aspect
Slavey has two semantic aspects: perfective and imperfective.

The perfective is represented in position 11:

The perfective can also be used with a past tense marker to indicate that at the point of reference, which is sometime in the past, the event was completed 

The imperfective indicates that the reference time precedes the end of the event time:

Word order
Slavey is a verb-final language. The basic word order is SOV.

Oblique objects precede the direct object.

Case
Slavey has no case markings. To differentiate between subject, direct object, and oblique objects, word order is used. The subject will be the first noun phrase, and the direct object will occur right before the verb. The oblique objects are controlled by postpositions.

Possessives

Possessive pronoun prefixes are found in Slavey. These pronouns have the same forms as the direct and oblique object pronouns. The prefixes are listed below with examples.

se- first-person singular

bá 'mitts'
sebáré 'my mitts'

mbeh 'knife'
sembehé 'my knife'

ne- second-person singular

ts'ah 'hat'
net'saré 'your (SG) hat'

tl'uh 'rope'
netl'ulé 'your (SG) rope'

be-/me- third-person singular

ye- fourth person

ʔe- unspecified possessor

ʔelįé 'someone's dog'

naxe-/raxe- first-person plural, second-person plural.

ts'éré 'blanket'
naxets'éré 'our blanket, your (PL) blanket'

ku-/ki-/go- third-person plural

Clauses

Conjunctions

There are both coordinating and subordinating conjunctions in Slavey.

Coordinating

gots'éh "and, and then"

kúlú, kólí, kúú, kóó, ékóó, góa "but"

Subordinating conjunctions

ʔenįdé, nįdé, ndé, néh "if, when, whenever"

-were "before"

-ts'ę "since, from"

-hé "because, so"

Relative clauses

There are three important parts to a relative clause. There is the head, which is the noun that is modified or delimited. The second part is the restricting sentence. The sentence modifies the head noun. The last part is the complementizer.

Status

North and South Slavey are recognized as official languages of the Northwest Territories; they may be used in court and in debates and proceedings of the Northwest Territories legislature. However, unlike English and French, the government only publishes laws and documents in North and South Slavey if the legislature requests it, and these documents are not authoritative.

In 2015, a Slavey woman named Andrea Heron challenged the territorial government over its refusal to permit the ʔ character, representing the Slavey glottal stop, in her daughter's name, Sakaeʔah, despite Slavey languages being official in the NWT. The territory argued that territorial and federal identity documents were unable to accommodate the character. Heron had registered the name with a hyphen instead of the ʔ when her daughter was born, but when Sakaeʔah was 6, Ms. Heron joined a challenge by a Chipewyan woman named Shene Catholique-Valpy regarding the same character in her own daughter's name, Sahaiʔa.

Also in 2015, the University of Victoria launched a language revitalization program in the NWT, pairing learners of indigenous languages including Slavey with fluent speakers. The program requires 100 hours of conversation with the mentor with no English allowed, as well as sessions with instructors in Fort Providence.

In popular culture
Slavey was the native language spoken by the fictional band in the Canadian television series North of 60. Nick Sibbeston, a former Premier of the Northwest Territories, was a Slavey language and culture consultant for the show.

See also
 Broken Slavey

References

Further reading

 Howard, Philip G. 1990. A Dictionary of the Verbs of South Slavey. Yellowknife: Dept. of Culture and Communications, Govt. of the Northwest Territories,  
 Isaiah, Stanley, et al. 1974. Golqah Gondie = Animal Stories - in Slavey. Yellowknife: Programme Development Division, Government of the Northwest Territories, .
 Mithun, Marianne. 1999. The Languages of Native North America. Cambridge: Cambridge University Press.  (hbk); .
 Monus, Vic, and Isaiah, Stanley. 1977. Slavey Topical Dictionary: A Topical List of Words and Phrases Reflecting the Dialect of the Slavey Language Spoken in the Fort Simpson Area. [Yellowknife: Government of the Northwest Territories, Canada?].
 Northwest Territories. 1993. South Slavey Legal Terminology. [Yellowknife, N.W.T.]: Dept. of Justice, Govt. of the Northwest Territories.
 Northwest Territories. 1981. Alphabet Posters in the Wrigley Dialect of the Slavey Language. [Yellowknife?]: Dept. of Education, Programs and Evaluation Branch.
 Tatti, Fibbie, and Howard, Philip G.. 1978. A Slavey Language Pre-Primer in the Speech of Fort Franklin. [Yellowknife]: Linguistic Programmes Division, Dept. of Education, Northwest Territories.
 Anand, Pranav and Nevins, Andrew. Shifty Operators in Changing Contexts. Massachusetts Institute of Technology. https://web.archive.org/web/20050517022822/http://www.fas.harvard.edu/~lingdept/IndexicalityWorkshop/anandnevins04.pdf
 Rice, Keren. 1989. A Grammar of Slave. Mouton Grammar Library (No. 5). Berlin: Mouton de Gruyter. .
 Sabourin, Margaret. 1975. Readers: Slavey Language. Yellowknife: Dept. of Education, Programme Development Division.

Northern Athabaskan languages
First Nations languages in Canada
First Nations in the Northwest Territories
Indigenous languages of the North American Subarctic